William Colonel Smith Jr. (born February 6, 1982) is an American politician who currently represents District 20 in the Maryland State Senate. He previously served as a delegate representing District 20, which includes large portions of Silver Spring and the entirety of Takoma Park, in the Maryland General Assembly.

Early life and education 
Smith was born on February 6, 1982, and raised in Silver Spring, Maryland, attending the Barrie School until his graduation in 2000. With the support of his family, Smith became a first generation college student, graduating from the College of William and Mary with a Bachelor of Arts in Government in 2004. Following his graduation, Smith earned a Master of Arts in government from Johns Hopkins University in 2006, and returned to the College of William and Mary for a Juris Doctor, graduating in 2009. In 2016 Smith was selected by his Naval Reserve unit to attend a training program at the National Intelligence University. In 2019 Smith graduated from National Intelligence University with a Masters in Strategic Intelligence (MSSI).

Military service 
Smith serves as an officer in the United States Navy Reserve and currently holds the rank of Lieutenant Commander. In March 2019, Smith deployed to Afghanistan in support of Operation Freedom's Sentinel, serving in Kabul, Afghanistan until October 2019. In Afghanistan Smith served as the Branch Chief for the Governance and the Afghan National Defense and Security Forces (ANDSF) divisions within the Combined Joint Intelligence Operations Center- Afghanistan (CJIOC-A). As Branch Chief, Smith ensured key leaders and planners maintained continuous situational awareness of emergent Afghan government and security force issues by providing timely and well-researched intelligence assessments and products during a particularly demanding and volatile period in Afghanistan's political history. Smith drove Command understanding of the Afghan presidential election, a Commander Resolute Support Priority Intelligence Requirement, by collaborating with the Combined Joint Operations Center (CJOC), North Atlantic Treaty Organization analytical fusion cell, and other coalition-partner organizations to provide timely intelligence and advice to senior leaders.

Prior to his service in Afghanistan Smith supported his unit's Afghanistan/Pakistan task force, and supported NATO Headquarters Allied Maritime Command in support of Operation Active Endeavor in Europe.

Public service 
Following his graduation from William and Mary, Smith worked as a legislative assistant at the ACLU under executive directors Laura Murphy and Caroline Frederickson. His work there focused on first and fourth amendment issues. Smith has served on the board of several local organizations, including IMPACT Silver Spring which focuses on promoting community ties in traditionally under served communities in Silver Spring. Smith also has served on the board of multiple organizations focusing on improving educational opportunities, including the Gandhi Brigade, the GapBuster Learning Center and his former high school, the Barrie School. In 2011, Smith became a Schedule C White House appointee serving as a director of the Homeland Security Advisory Council; in his time on the council Smith worked in conjunction with other council members to advise Janet Napolitano, then-Secretary of Homeland Security.

Maryland legislature 
Smith was elected to the Maryland House of Delegates in November 2014, succeeding Heather Mizeur. Smith served on the House Judiciary Committee and quickly became one of the most effective legislators in Annapolis. Smith was the lead sponsor of 14 successful bills during his tenure in the House, including HB 1009 the Good Samaritan Law, which ensured those who report drug and alcohol related medical emergencies would not be prosecuted.

Following Jamie Raskin's election to the United States House of Representatives, Smith was appointed to the Maryland Senate. Smith had a successful first session in Maryland's upper chamber. Smith was the lead sponsor of 14 successful pieces of legislation during 2017. He shepherded through legislation including SB 651, which barred Maryland public schools from suspending and expelling children in prekindergarten up to and including second grade; SB 943 which established a dispute resolution process between preschools and parents with children with disabilities, and the Hire our Veterans Act of 2017, which created income tax credits to incentivize small businesses to hire veterans. Smith also was the lead sponsor on the Home Act, which would have barred landlords from discriminating against renters with housing vouchers and a Gun-Free Higher Education bill. Smith is a member of the Legislative Black Caucus, one of the first men to join the Women's Caucus, and is the Chair of the Veterans' Caucus.

Smith has earned various legislative awards during his tenure as a Maryland legislator, including:
 Foundation for Advancing Alcohol Responsibility Leadership Award (2015)
 Foundation for Advancing Alcohol Responsibility Leadership Award (2016)
 The Arc Maryland Legislator of the Year Award (2017)
 The Mid-Atlantic Innocence Project & University of Baltimore Innocence Clinic “Advocate for Innocence” Award (2018)
 The Korean Community Service Center of Greater Washington Public Service Award (2018)
 The American Legion Department of Maryland, Inc. Legislator of the Year Award (2019)
 American Montessori Society Dr. Maria Montessori Ambassador Award Honoree (2019)
 A Wider Circle Outstanding Leadership & Public Service Award (2020)

Chairman of the Judicial Proceedings Committee 

In 2019 Smith became the 50th Chairman of the Judicial Proceedings Committee. He is the first African American to hold the post. With Smith as Chairman the committee has moved in a decidedly more progressive direction. As Chairman Smith has orchestrated the passage of significant reforms in the areas or parole reform, police reform, equity in housing, and civil rights.

 Juvenile Justice Reform
 The Juvenile Justice Coordinated Council Reform: Comprehensive overhaul of Maryland’s criminal code as applied to children to reflect national best practices (SB691/HB459).
 The Juvenile Interrogation Act ensuring children’s due process rights when they are taken into custody (SB53/HB269) and
 Juvenile Restoration Act – Ending the practice of sentencing youths to prison without the possibility of parole
 Police Reform
 Repeal of the Law Enforcement Officer’s Bill of Rights (LEOBR) and Establishment of Uniform Police Accountability Standards
 Anton’s Law: Transparency into Police Disciplinary Records
 Curtailing No-Knock Warrants
 Independent Investigations of Police-Involved Deaths
 Establishing a Statewide Use of Force Standard
 Requiring the Usage of Body-Worn Cameras
 Demilitarization of Police
 Expanding Access to Mental Health Services for Police Officers
 Expanding Police Department Liability for Police Violence
 Local Control of the Baltimore Police Department
 Parole Reform
 Compensation to Individual Erroneously Convicted, Sentenced, and Confined (The Walter Lomax Act)
 Correctional Services – Parole – Life Imprisonment (Getting the Governor Out of Parole)
 Juveniles Convicted as Adults – Sentencing – Limitations and Reduction (Juvenile Restoration Act)  A series of recent Supreme Court decisions have acknowledged the inhumanity of sentencing a juvenile to life without the possibility of parole. Senate Bill 494/House Bill 409, abolishes the practice of sentencing a youth to die in prison without an opportunity to petition the court for consideration of a reduction in sentence.
 Civil Rights 
 SB 531 – The CROWN Act - Discrimination – Definition of Race – Hair Texture and Hairstyles (2020)
 SB0606 - Criminal Law - Hate Crimes - Basis (2nd Lieutenant Richard Collins, III's Law) holds people accountable when they commit a crime out of motivation in relation to another person’s race, religion, sexual orientation, gender, disability, or national origin.
 The Inclusive Schools Act - Prohibits any prekindergarten, primary, or secondary school in the state, including both public schools and private schools receiving state funding, from discriminating against a student or a prospective student based on race, ethnicity, color, religion, sex, age, national origin, marital status, sexual orientation, gender identity, or disability (SB666/HB850).
 Prohibiting a court from reducing the amount of money damages awarded to a plaintiff based on race, ethnicity or gender. This bill will ensure that less discriminatory factors are relied upon when calculating a loss of expected lifetime earnings (HB244).
 Preventing a debtor in a small claims action from being subject to a civil arrest warrant – also known as a body attachment. Under certain conditions, an individual may not know there is any such warrant for their arrest. This bill prevents arrest of individuals for unpaid debts in small claims court (SB452/HB349).
 Major advances in preventing workplace harassment, including a bill to treat sexual harassment in the workplace the same as any other form of harassment, and expand the definition of workplace harassment to cover cases in which submission to the harassment is made a condition of employment, or an otherwise hostile and abusive workplace is created (SB451). 
 Expanding access to justice for victims of workplace harassment by tolling the statute of limitations so that an individual has enough time to request an administrative investigation into the workplace conduct. After the conclusion of the case before the administrative body, such as the Maryland Commission for Civil Rights, the individual retains the ability to file suit in a court of law (SB451).

Significant Legislation Sponsored by Senator Smith 

SB 530 - Housing Opportunities Made Equal Act – HOME ACT (2020)

 Ending the practice of housing discrimination based on one's legal source of income. Home Act seeks to deconcentrate poverty by providing additional opportunities for tenants utilizing public subsidies to live in certain neighborhoods; prohibiting a person from refusing to sell or rent a dwelling to any person because of source of income; establishing qualifications and limitations on the prohibition against discrimination in housing based on source of income; etc.

SB 1048 – Secure and Accessible Registration Act (Enacted over Governor's Veto) (2018)

 Redesignating electronic voter registration agencies as automatic voter registration agencies; requiring automatic voter registration agencies to inform an applicant completing an applicable transaction that the applicant shall be registered to vote or shall have a voter registration record updated unless the applicant declines these services or is not eligible to register to vote; requiring automatic voter registration agencies to implement automatic voter registration by July 1, 2019

SB 651 – Public Schools - Suspensions and Expulsions (Enacted over Governor's Veto) (2017)

 Prohibiting the suspension or expulsion of prekindergarten, kindergarten, first grade, or second grade students from public schools with specified exceptions for an expulsion required by federal law or a suspension for not more than 5 school days under specified circumstances

SB 196 - Vehicle Laws - Licenses, Identification Cards, and Moped Operator's Permits - Indication of Applicant's Sex (2019)

 Requiring an application for a license, an identification card, or a moped operator's permit to allow an applicant to indicate the applicant's sex as female, male, or unspecified or other; requiring the Motor Vehicle Administration to ensure that the license, identification card, or moped operator's permit of an applicant who indicates that the applicant's sex is unspecified or other displays an "X" in the location on the license, identification card, or permit that indicates the applicant's sex; etc.

SB 531 – The CROWN Act - Discrimination – Definition of Race – Hair Texture and Hairstyles (2020)

 Defining "race", for the purposes of certain laws prohibiting discrimination, to include certain traits associated with race, including hair texture, afro hairstyles, and protective hairstyles; defining "protective hairstyle" as one that includes braids, twists, and locks; and authorizing an employer to establish and require an employee to adhere to reasonable workplace standards related to the nature of the employment of the employee and that are not precluded by any provision of State or federal law, subject to a certain exception.

SB 328 - Labor and Employment - Noncompete and Conflict of Interest Clauses (2019)

 Providing that certain noncompete and conflict of interest provisions that restrict the ability of an employee to enter into employment with a new employer or to become self-employed in the same or similar business or trade are null and void as being against the public policy of the State; providing the Act does not apply to an employment contract or similar document or agreement with respect to the taking or use of a client list or other proprietary client-related information; etc.

SB 766 - Public Schools - Student Discipline - Restorative Approaches (2019)

 Requiring the State Board of Education to provide technical assistance and training to county boards of education regarding the use of restorative approaches on request; requiring certain regulations to incorporate the use of restorative approaches; requiring the State Department of Education to submit to the Governor and the General Assembly, on or before October 1 of each year, a student discipline data report that includes a description of restorative approaches in the State and a review of disciplinary practices and policies; etc.

SB 767 - Criminal Procedure - Sexual Assault Evidence Collection Kits - Analysis (2019)

 Requiring that a sexual assault evidence collection kit be submitted to a forensic laboratory for analysis unless a certain requirement is met; requiring that a victim who wishes to remain anonymous and not file a criminal complaint be informed that the victim may initiate a criminal complaint at a future time; requiring a certain law enforcement agency that receives a sexual assault evidence collection kit to submit the kit and all requested associated reference standards for forensic analysis within 30 days of receipt of the kit; etc.

SB 949 – Criminal Procedure - Expungement - Possession of Marijuana (Enacted over Governor's Veto) (2017)

 Authorizing a person to file a petition for expungement at a specified time if the person was convicted of possession of marijuana

References

External links 
 
 

1982 births
Living people
Democratic Party Maryland state senators
People from Silver Spring, Maryland
African-American state legislators in Maryland
21st-century American politicians
21st-century African-American politicians
20th-century African-American people
College of William & Mary alumni
Johns Hopkins University alumni